Henry Thomas Augustus Spry (bapt. 2 July 1834 – 17 February 1904) was an English playwright and pantomime performer who co-wrote and appeared in nearly 50 productions with George Conquest at the Surrey Theatre and elsewhere.

Early life
Henry Spry was born in 1834 in Bloomsbury, London to Charles and Sarah Maria Spry.

Family
Spry married Eliza Sarah Hassan in 1859. Their daughter Alice was an actress.

Career
Spry was a playwright and pantomime performer who co-wrote and appeared in nearly 50 productions with George Conquest at the Surrey Theatre and elsewhere.

He died in 1904 in Islington, aged 69.

Works with George Conquest
Spitz-Spitz the Spider Crab; or The Pirate of Spitsbergen. Grecian Theatre, 1875.
Jack and the Beanstalk, which grew to the moon; or, the Giant, Jack Frost and the Ha-Ha Balloon. Surrey Theatre, 1886. Starring Dan Leno and wife.
Sinbad and the Little Old Man of the Sea; or, The Tinker, the Tailor, the Soldier, the Sailor, Apothecary, Ploughboy, Gentleman Thief. Surrey Theatre, 1887. Starring Dan Leno and wife.

References 

Pantomime
English dramatists and playwrights
19th-century English male actors
1834 births
1904 deaths
English male stage actors